James Martin Frost (born 22 August 1986) is the guitarist, keyboardist and backing vocalist of Welsh band The Automatic, and guitarist and backing vocalist for Cardiff-based band Effort. As well as his musical duties for The Automatic, Frost has also directed two of the band's music videos and their tour video diaries. He currently resides in Cardiff, Wales.

Musical career

The Automatic (2005–present)
Frost began playing guitar at a young age, and after introducing bandmate Robin Hawkins into music and the bass guitar, Frost and Hawkins along with friend Iwan Griffiths formed the band White Rabbit, which later with the addition of Alex Pennie became The Automatic. After several years of touring, Alex Pennie departed from the band, leading to Paul Mullen from Yourcodenameis:Milo to join the band. Frost and Mullen are both simply stated as guitarists for The Automatic, neither being specifically rhythm or lead. Paul and Frost also provide synthesizers on various tracks, as well as backing vocals.

After the release of the band's debut album Not Accepted Anywhere, James was voted No. 20 in NME's Cool List, beating his at-the-time bandmate Alex Pennie.

Effort (2010–2011)
Frost, along with BBC Radio 1 DJ Jen Long formed the Cardiff-based band Effort in 2010. In early 2011 the band recorded demos at Long Wave Studios with producer Romesh Dodangoda. Their debut 3-track EP 'No Effort' was released for free on 28 March 2011 through bandcamp.

Musical equipment and style
Frost often states his main musical influence to be Blur and specifically guitarist Graham Coxon, his favourite Blur album is 13.

For live performances – since the departure of synthesizer player & vocalist Alex Pennie in 2007, Frost inherited performance duties of the Alesis Micron – which during the recording and performance of debut album Not Accepted Anywhere was one of 3 synthesizer keyboards used, later on This Is a Fix it was also used as well as the Paul Mullen controlled microKORG. The sounds created on the Alesis Andromeda and Roland Juno-106 for Not Accepted Anywhere since Pennies departure are recreated live on the microKORG and Alesis Micron, to control some tracks whilst playing guitar, Frost uses a Boss RC-50 Loop Station, which enables partial foot pedal control of the sounds available on the Alesis Micron. Frost uses bandmate Rob Hawkins Fender USA Jazz Bass live when performing "High Time".

Frost also uses a range of guitars for both live and recording, during the recording and touring of debut album Not Accepted Anywhere the then only guitarist of The Automatic used various models of the Gibson Les Paul as well as a Fender 1972 Thinline Telecaster in Two-Tone Sunburst, Fender Mustang 2005 Reissue in Olympic White, and in various music videos used a could be seen using a Gordon Smith GSII in Black, which he broke in 2007, and a Gibson ES-335. With the release of second album This Is a Fix and joining of second guitarist Paul Mullen, Frost began incorporating the use of Fender Telecaster Deluxe's.

For Digital Delay, Frost uses a Boss DD-6 pedal and a Line 6 DL4 Modeler stompbox, as well as using MXR M-106 6-Band Graphic EQ, and a number of Electro-Harmonix effects including an Electro-Harmonix POG, Holy Stain and Holy Grail, whilst using an Orange Channel Footswitch. During the recording of Not Accepted Anywhere, the album sleeve states that Frost uses both Orange and Marshall guitar amplifiers.

Discography

Filmography

References

1986 births
Living people
The Automatic members
British rock guitarists
British male guitarists
Welsh guitarists
Welsh rock musicians
People from Cowbridge